Meaghamann is a 2014 Indian Tamil-language action thriller film written and directed by Magizh Thirumeni and produced by Nemichand Jhabak. The film stars Arya and Hansika Motwani, while Ashutosh Rana, Sudhanshu Pandey, Ramana, Ashish Vidyarthi, Mahadevan, and Harish Uthaman play supporting roles. S. Thaman composed the film's music. It was also dubbed in Hindi under the same title and premiered on Zee Cinema. It was released in Telugu as Mande Suryudu. The film was declared Semi-Hit at the box office.

Plot
In Goa, 6 dead bodies are washed ashore where the police department deduce that Jothi, a drug lord is responsible for the mess. The police is unable to capture him for nearly a decade because not a single person has seen him in person as he is constantly on the move and has no permanent aides or accomplices.

Chitti is in charge for the drug trafficking in and around Goa. One day, he receives a call from Jothi about a missing drug consignment. Chitti and his men are unable to hunt down the culprit where it is revealed that Shiva is the mastermind behind the drug theft and is working for Chitti as his most trusted henchman. Chitti, along with Shiva and his nephew Guru, runs a crime syndicate in Goa.

In a turn of events, Shiva is actually Arul, an undercover officer who is assigned to expose Jothi and his entire drug cartel. He receives instructions from his higher officers Bharathi and Benjamin Vas and informs them about the activities of his gang from time to time. Arul is into this mission, along with his best friend and colleague Karthik, who also takes a stage name as Malik and works for Sharma, another drug lord from Mumbai, who is in possession of 1000 kg of pure heroin and is looking for a buyer.

The plan of Bharathi, Benjamin, and their team is to make Sharma and Jothi meet each other for the transaction of the 1000 kg of heroin and arrest them. Arul informs Bharathi that Sharma and Jothi are planning for a trial with just 100 kg of heroin, and if all goes well, they will deal with the remaining 900 kg. Bharathi and her team wisely plan to capture the huge bulk of 900 kg of drugs, along with Sharma and Jothi, so they have to leave the first trial transaction unmonitored. However, all plans go awry when Bharathi's jealous boss does not agree to her plan and conducts a raid for the trial transaction in the last moment.

The raid exposes Karthik's identity, who is taken to Chitti's place and gets tortured by Guru and his gang to reveal the identity of any other man working with him. Unable to bear the pain, Karthik reveals Arul's identity. Guru informs Chitti about Arul's true identity. When they attempt to kill him, Arul guns down Chitti and starts eliminating all the gang members, including Guru. Soon, Arul finds Karthik, but within moments, Karthik dies. Jothi is now aware of the death of Chitti and his entire crew and uses his influence to the cops to bring Arul into his custody.

The police force and Jothi's men join hands and hunt for Arul. Arul, all alone on this mission, still continues his own plan to expose Jothi and gets himself captured on purpose. Now that he has nothing to lose, he plans to play a final game of chance to meet Jothi face to face, earn his trust, and join as henchman again. Arul is the only survivor of the shootout at Chitti's place, and so only his account to Jothi will earn his trust.

Arul is brought to Jothi and is also able to cleverly convince him, but only up to an extent. He tells Jothi that his former partner-turned-archenemy Rane is responsible for the drug theft and shootout at Chitti's place. Jothi had been thinking Rane was dead, but Rane is actually alive and is plotting his vengeance. Jothi is still skeptical, so Arul is given 2 days to prove that Rane is alive and has done all these things. Arul succeeds by getting help from a prostitute whom he helped earlier.

Arul places all the stolen drugs at Rane's house and leads Jothi's men there, and they find the lost drugs. Jothi asks his men to kill Rane and his gang. Shiva cleverly does certain manipulations, kills Rane and his men, and places his own guns in Rane's hands. This leads Jothi and his men to believe that Rane's gun and the one used in the shootout at Chitti's place are the same. The gun is also sent for ballistic testing to check on Arul's story, and they all believe Arul's story is true.

Jothi asks Arul to join his gang and meet him at a secluded place. When Arul waits for the opportunity to gun down Jothi, he gets beaten up by his men. It is then revealed that his neighbor Usha, who was in love with Arul, had been secretly recording videos of him for her to admire, but her phone falls into the hands of Jothi's men. They find whom Arul has been meeting and dealing with so far and come to know he is also an undercover cop. As a result, Bharathi and Benjamin are assassinated by Jothi's men.

Jothi and his men beat Arul savagely, keep him bound in a harbor, and ask him the whereabouts of Sharma's remaining 900 kg of heroin. Arul whispers the location, and as Jothi comes closer to hear him, Arul spits blood onto his eyes. When all of Jothi's men are distracted, Arul escapes from his captors and kills them, leaving Jothi alone, and arrests him. Since nobody alive has seen Jothi in person, his arrest is unavoidable, and no political influence will work out. Arul rejects Usha's proposal and asks her to focus on her life. He then moves on to his next mission and kills Sharma and seizes the remaining 900 kg of heroin.

Cast

 Arya as DSP Arul (Siva), undercover IPS officer, Mumbai Police
 Hansika Motwani as Usha
 Ashutosh Rana as Jothi Bhai (King)
 Sudhanshu Pandey as Rane, Jothi's nemesis
 Ramana as Karthik Vishwanath IPS, DSP, Gujarat Police, undercover in Sharma's gang / Malik
 Ashish Vidyarthi as Sharma (Bishop)
 Mahadevan as Chitti (Castle)
 Avinash as Avinash Bhote (Knight)
 Harish Uthaman as Guru
 Anupama Kumar as AC Bharathi Chandrasekar
 O. A. K. Sundar as AC Benjamin Vas
 Sanjana Singh as Rane's wife
 Jeeva Ravi as Anil Nair
 Saravana Subbiah as Sathish Gawade
 Maha Gandhi as Issaac (Pawn)
 C. K. Jeeva as Usha's father
 Gaayathri Raman as Usha's mother
 Saberna Anand as Saberna (SI's wife)
 Vinoth Shaam as Rane's brother
 Pondy Ravi as Yakub
 Anandhi as Pavithra
 Vel Ravindran as Anil Nair
 Shimor as David
 Maaran as Prakash
 Nicholas as Chandra
 Aathma Patrick

Production

Development
Reports in early 2013 suggested that Magizh Thirumeni would make a police film starring Arya and Samantha, though, by February 2013, the actor came out and stated he had no dates available to commit. In August 2013, producer Hitesh Jhabak was able to unite the director and actor, revealing that the pair had signed terms to begin a film under his production house in late 2013. It was revealed that the music would be scored by Thaman, cinematography by Satish Kumar, art direction by Mohana Mahendran and editing by Praveen-Srikanth. The director revealed that the film would be an action entertainer which would cover the lives of middle-class people, and would see Arya in a new phase in terms of his body language and would also provide a new dimension to his acting style. Despite reports that the venture would be titled Vadi Vaasal, the team announced that the title of the project would be Meaghamann.

Casting and filming
Shruti Haasan was reported to have been approached to play the lead female role in October 2013, though she declined to comment on the speculation. Taapsee Pannu, Arya's co-star in Arrambam (2013), had also been linked to the role. The team also later considered Hansika Motwani for the role. It was revealed that the film would feature seven actors in villainous roles, with North Indian actors Sudhanshu Pandey, Ashutosh Rana and Ashish Vidyarthi signed on to portray roles in the film. Avinash, Mahadevan, Maha Gandhi and Harish Uthaman were also subsequently later selected to complete the set of villains in the film. Hansika described her character to be that of a Tamil Brahmin girl named Sathya, who is "self-centred and egotistical".

Principal photography began on 2 December 2013 in Goa. The further shooting took place in Chennai and Gujarat, during which a few shots were canned at Binny Mills. The film's first look poster was released on 1 January 2014 with a caption entitled "captain of the ship". The next schedule commenced on 1 June 2014, during which the climax fight was shot in Thoothukudi. A tango sequence featuring the lead pair was shot in mid-June 2014, choreographed by Viji Sathish, a former assistant of Raju Sundaram, who also confirmed that 70% of the film was completed. Shooting wrapped up on 10 July 2014 with a song sequence. For shooting one of the songs, which featured an intimate sequence between the lead pair, Thirumeni shot the song in such a way that it wouldn't look "vulgar" on screen.

Music

S. Thaman composed the music for the film. The soundtrack album consists of three songs and a piece of theme music. The audio launch of the film took place on 14 August 2014.

The album received mixed reviews from critics. Sify gave 2 out of 5 and wrote, "On the whole, Thaman delivers an underwhelming, short soundtrack which suggests that the movie has less scope for songs. Yean Ingu Vandhaan stands out from the rest of the songs in the album though." Cinemalead gave 2 out of 5 and concluded, "While everyone here is waiting for him to recreate the magic that he usually creates in Telugu, Thaman's outing in Meaghamann isn't a great one. It would be fair to say that the album doesn't provide him enough space to prove himself." Milliblog wrote, "Surprisingly short soundtrack by Thaman, with Yaen Ingu Vandhaan being the undeniable winner." Indiaglitz summarised, "A typical Thaman's feast". Behindwoods gave 1.75 out of 5 and concluded, "Meaghamann is a typical Thaman style album high on percussions but failing to offer anything new"

Release
Made on a budget of 24 crore, the teaser of the film was unveiled on 3 July 2014 on YouTube. Behindwoods wrote in its teaser review, "With his muscular physique and sharp looks, Arya surely is on top of his game. Gear up for an action packed Arya and a thrilling tale." Indiaglitz wrote, "Not only the content but also the idea has made Meagamann teaser one of the most interesting and innovative ones in the recent times". A second teaser was uploaded on YouTube on 13 August 2014. The lead cast along with Magizh Thirumeni promoted the film on 15 August 2014 during Independence Day on STAR Vijay. The satellite rights of the film were sold to STAR Vijay for a rumoured .

The film was released on 25 December 2014 alongside three other films.

Reception
The film gained generally positive reviews from critics. Baradwaj Rangan from The Hindu wrote, "the younger Tamil directors are slowly adopting the Hollywood model, which is the only model that works when it comes to gritty action-adventures...The plotting is pretty tight...More impressively, the director doesn’t seek to pander to family audiences. He understands that a certain amount of brutality is necessary in these films, and he unleashes scenes of corpse-kicking and chainsaw-abetted-limb-hacking and a scene with a maimed eyeball that probably has Buñuel chuckling". The Times of India gave the film 3.5 stars out of 5 and wrote, "Meaghamann takes a while to pick up...But once we get the background info on the various gangs, cops and the moles on either side, we are drawn into the plot, which is intricately woven and manages to keep us on the edge of our seats". IANS gave 3 stars out of 5 and called it an "almost satisfying action film going by Tamil cinema standards".

In contrast, Sify wrote, "Meaghamann is another film where the plot is ambitious and paper work is good but falls short in execution. Acting in most parts is acceptable but the film never manages to captivate its audience". Indiaglitz.com wrote that the film "fails to hit the bulls eye" and is "certainly not the captain of the ship" but called it "nevertheless a good watch" and a "rock-solid entertainer with a volley of twists and action".

References

External links 
 

2014 films
2010s Tamil-language films
Indian action drama films
2014 action drama films
Fictional portrayals of the Tamil Nadu Police
Indian action thriller films
Films scored by Thaman S
Films about drugs
2014 action thriller films
Films directed by Magizh Thirumeni